Love Tara is the first full-length album by Canadian indie band Eric's Trip.

It was their first release on Seattle's Sub Pop record label and their second not independently released, as well as the first album by a Canadian act to be released by Sub Pop. The album was self-recorded in three months and reflects Sub Pop's shift toward lighter, more melodic music from the grunge on which it initially built its reputation. Though the lo-fi quality of the record threw many listeners and critics off, it was still very well received in both Canada and the United States.

Critical reception

Mike Bell of the Calgary Herald praised the album as "Simplistic, charming, front-porch folk-pop with melodies that stick like a gradeschool tongue to a flag pole or rock riffs that sound like a dysfunctional Partridge Family jamming in the garage."

In Chart's Top 50 Canadian Albums of All Time polls, Love Tara ranked 35th in 1996, and 37th in 2000. It was also ranked 39th in Bob Mersereau's 2007 book The Top 100 Canadian Albums.

At the 2017 Polaris Music Prize awards ceremony, the album won the jury vote for the Heritage Prize in the 1986–1995 category.

Influence on other musicians
Sloan covered the song "Stove" in the 1993 compilation album DGC Rarities Volume 1, which combined "Stove" into a medley with "Smother", a non-album track that Eric's Trip recorded for the Never Mind the Molluscs compilation.

The title of the album was referenced in The Tragically Hip's song "Put It Off", from their 1996 album Trouble at the Henhouse: "I played Love Tara/by Eric's Trip/on the day that you were born".

Track listing

References

1993 debut albums
Eric's Trip albums
Sub Pop albums
Lo-fi music albums